Nikolayevsk-na-Amure Air Enterprise was an airline based in Nikolayevsk-on-Amur, Khabarovsk Krai, Russia. It operates regional services. Its main base is Nikolayevsk-on-Amur Airport.

History 

The airline was established in 1992. It was formerly the  Aeroflot Nikolayevsk-na-Amure Division.

Fleet 

As of January 2005, the Nikolayevsk-na-Amure Air Enterprise fleet included:

3 Yakovlev Yak-40
1 Yakovlev Yak-40K

References 

Defunct airlines of Russia
Former Aeroflot divisions
Airlines established in 1992
Companies based in Khabarovsk Krai